The Kazan Herald (Rus.: Казанский Вестник, Tat.: Казан Мөхбире) is the only English-language online newspaper published in Kazan, the capital of Tatarstan, Russia. It was also distributed free of charge in tourism and business locations in Kazan and other cities around the Republic of Tatarstan, including Yelabuga, Nizhnekamsk, and Naberezhnye Chelny 
.

Founded in May 2010, the newspaper aims to provide English-language summaries of local news developments within Tatarstan from a foreign viewpoint and also covers local business and sports developments. It also serves as a voice for Kazan's expatriate community and includes sections on foreign opinions of Tatarstan and its politics as well as news on expatriate life. The Kazan Herald''' maintains a regularly updated website and releases a print version once a month.

In November 2010, The Kazan Herald'' was presented with an award for English-language media at the Tatarstan Republican Youth Forum, as a part of the Republic's growing interest in improving English-language proficiency before Kazan's hosting of the Universiade in 2013.

See also
List of newspapers in Russia
Media of Russia

References

External links

Newspapers published in Russia
English-language newspapers published in Europe
Newspapers established in 2010
2010 establishments in Russia
Kazan